Malin Birgitta Berghagen (born 11 May 1966; called Berghagen Nilsson when she was married to Tommy Nilsson) is a Swedish actress and singer. She is daughter of Lasse Berghagen and Lill-Babs and half-sister to the TV host Kristin Kaspersen.

In 1992, she received a Guldmask Award.

Selected filmography 
1992 – Luciafesten (TV)
1992 – Svart Lucia
1992 – Rederiet (TV)
2002 – Stora teatern (TV)
2004 – Det okända (TV)
2006 – Wallander – Luftslottet
2006 – Swedish language version of Cars as the voice of Sally Carrera

References

External links 
Official website

1966 births
Living people
People from Sollentuna Municipality
Swedish television actresses
Swedish voice actresses
Swedish women singers
20th-century Swedish actresses
21st-century Swedish actresses
20th-century Swedish women singers
21st-century Swedish women singers